Ahmed Al-Yassi (Arabic:أحمد الياسي) (born 31 July 1988) is an Emirati footballer who plays as a right back.

External links

References

Emirati footballers
1988 births
Living people
Al Dhafra FC players
Ajman Club players
Al-Nasr SC (Dubai) players
Khor Fakkan Sports Club players
Place of birth missing (living people)
UAE First Division League players
UAE Pro League players
Association football defenders